Henry Smith (born July 19, 1983) is a former American football defensive tackle. He was signed by the New England Patriots as an undrafted free agent in 2008. He played college football at Texas A&M.

Smith was also a member of the St. Louis Rams and Jacksonville Jaguars.

Professional career

New England Patriots
After going undrafted in the 2008 NFL Draft, Smith was signed by the New England Patriots. He was waived on June 12.

St. Louis Rams
Smith was signed by the St. Louis Rams on July 30, 2008, but was waived during final cuts on August 29.

Jacksonville Jaguars
Smith was signed to the practice squad of the Jacksonville Jaguars on December 23, 2008.

External links
Jacksonville Jaguars bio
New England Patriots bio
Texas A&M Aggies bio

1983 births
Living people
American football defensive tackles
Players of American football from Alabama
People from Aliceville, Alabama
Texas A&M Aggies football players
New England Patriots players
St. Louis Rams players
Jacksonville Jaguars players